The 2015 San Diego Padres season was their 47th season in MLB, and their 12th at Petco Park. General Manager A. J. Preller had a busy offseason, acquiring a new starting outfield in Matt Kemp, Justin Upton, and Wil Myers, while adding to an already strong bullpen with All-Star closer Craig Kimbrel. The Padres also signed free agent starting pitcher James Shields. San Diego traded away seven of its top 11 prospects, as rated by Baseball America entering the offseason.

After starting the season 32–33 and six games behind in the National League West, the Padres fired manager Bud Black, who had managed the team for eight-plus seasons. Bench coach Dave Roberts filled in as manager for one game until Pat Murphy was named the interim manager. After spending one season as a third base coach for the Diamondbacks, on October 29, 2015, Andy Green was named manager of the San Diego Padres.

Offseason

October 30: Tim Stauffer and Josh Johnson become free agents.
 Stauffer signed with the Minnesota Twins.
 Johnson re-signed with the Padres.

November 3: Sent 3 players to the minors.

November 18: Signed Benji Gonzalez to a minor league contract.

November 20: Promoted 3 players from the minors, sent 2 to the minors, signed Griff Erickson to a minor league contract and invited him to spring training, and sent Raymond Fuentes to the Kansas City Royals for Kyle Bartsch.

November 26: Blaine Boyer becomes a free agent.
 Boyer signed with the Minnesota Twins.

November 27: Signed Jason Lane to a minor league contract and invited him to spring training.

December 2: Everth Cabrera becomes a free agent.

December 3: Signed Bryant Aragon to a minor league contract.

December 5: Signed Clint Barmes.

December 11: Signed Trayvon Robinson to a minor league contract.

December 15: Signed Brett Wallace to a minor league contract and invited him to spring training.

December 16: Sent Juan Pablo Oramas to the minors.

December 18-December 20: Signed Brandon Morrow and made the following trades:
 Received Matt Kemp, Tim Federowicz, and cash from the Los Angeles Dodgers for Yasmani Grandal, Joe Wieland, and Zach Eflin.
 Received Derek Norris and Seth Streich from the Oakland Athletics for Jesse Hahn and R. J. Alvarez.
 Received Wil Myers, Ryan Hanigan, Jose Castillo, and Gerardo Reyes from the Tampa Bay Rays for René Rivera, Burch Smith, and Jake Bauers.
 Received Justin Upton and Aaron Northcraft from the Atlanta Braves for Jace Peterson, Max Fried, Dustin Peterson, and Mallex Smith.
 Sent Joe Ross and an unnamed player to the Washington Nationals.
 Sent Ryan Hanigan to the Boston Red Sox for Will Middlebrooks.

December 29: Sent Keyvius Sampson to the minors and sent Johnny Barbato to the New York Yankees and received Shawn Kelley.

December 30: Received Brandon Maurer from the Seattle Mariners for Seth Smith.

January 7: Sent Jake Goebbert to the minors and signed Scott Elbert to a minor league contract with an invite to spring training.

January 8: Signed José Valverde and Marcos Mateo to minor league contracts and invited Valverde to spring training.

January 9: Signed Daniel McCutchen to a minor league contract.

January 15: Signed Luis Hernández to a minor league contract.

January 26: Invited 10 players to spring training and signed 2 others to minor league contracts with invites to spring training.

January 31: Signed Wil Nieves to a minor league contract.

February 5: Signed Zach Segovia to a minor league contract.

February 11: Signed James Shields.

April 5: Received Craig Kimbrel and Melvin Upton, Jr. from the Atlanta Braves for Carlos Quentin, Cameron Maybin, and Matt Wisler

Season standings

National League West

National League Wild Card

Record vs. opponents

Game log

|-
|-  style="text-align:center; background-color:#ffbbbb"
| 1 || April 6 || @ Dodgers || 3–6 || Peralta (1–0) || Kelley (0–1) || Hatcher (1) || 53,518 || 0–1 || Box
|- style="text-align:center; background-color:#bbffbb"
| 2 || April 7 || @ Dodgers || 7–3 || Benoit (1–0) || Hatcher (0–1) ||  || 40,356 || 1–1 || Box
|- style="text-align:center; background-color:#ffbbbb"
| 3 || April 8 || @ Dodgers || 4–7 || McCarthy (1–0) || Cashner (0–1) || Peralta (1) || 52,204 || 1–2 || Box
|- style="text-align:center; background-color:#ffbbbb"
| 4 || April 9 || Giants || 0–1 (12) || Kontos (1–0) || Vincent (0–1) || Casilla (3) || 45,150 || 1–3 || Box
|- style="text-align:center; background-color:#bbffbb"
| 5 || April 10 || Giants || 1–0 || Benoit (2–0) || Affeldt (0–1) || Kimbrel (1) || 40,015 || 2–3 || Box
|- style="text-align:center; background-color:#bbffbb"
| 6 || April 11 || Giants || 10–2 || Shields (1–0) || Bumgarner (1–1) ||  || 42,823 || 3–3 || Box
|- style="text-align:center; background-color:#bbffbb"
| 7 || April 12 || Giants || 6–4  ||  Ross (1–0)  || Peavy (0–1)  || Kimbrel (2) || 40,184 || 4–3 || Box
|- style="text-align:center; background-color:#ffbbbb"
| 8 || April 13 || Diamondbacks || 4–8 || De La Rosa (2–0) || Cashner (0–2) ||  || 19,538 || 4–4 || Box
|- style="text-align:center; background-color:#bbffbb"
| 9 || April 14 || Diamondbacks || 5–1 || Despaigne (1–0) || Hellickson (0–2) ||  || 20,102 || 5–4 || Box
|- style="text-align:center; background-color:#bbffbb"
| 10 || April 15 || Diamondbacks || 3–2 || Benoit (3–0) || Delgado (0–1) || Kimbrel (3) || 23,104 || 6–4 || Box
|- style="text-align:center; background-color:#bbffbb"
| 11 || April 17 || @ Cubs || 5–4 || Shields (2–0) || Schlitter (0–1) || Kimbrel (4) || 32,138 || 7–4 || Box
|- style="text-align:center; background-color:#ffbbbb"
| 12 || April 18 || @ Cubs || 6–7 (11) || Rosscup (1–0) || Kimbrel (0–1) ||  || 33,958 || 7–5 || Box
|- style="text-align:center; background-color:#bbffbb"
| 13 || April 19 || @ Cubs || 5–2 || Cashner (1–2) || Lester (0–2) || Benoit (1) || 29,113 || 8–5 || Box 
|- style="text-align:center; background-color:#bbffbb"
| 14 || April 20 || @ Rockies || 14–3 || Despaigne (2–0) || de la Rosa (0–1) ||  || 22,586 || 9–5 || Box
|- style="text-align:center; background-color:#bbffbb" 
| 15 || April 21 || @ Rockies || 7–6 || Maurer (1–0) || Logan (0–1) || Kimbrel (5) || 22,600 || 10–5 || Box
|- style="text-align:center; background-color:#ffbbbb" 
| 16 || April 22 || @ Rockies || 4–5 || Ottavino (1–0) || Kelley (0–2) ||   || 22,705 || 10–6 || Box
|- style="text-align:center; background-color:#ffbbbb"
| 17 || April 23 || @ Rockies || 1–2 || Lyles (2–1) || Ross (1–1) || Axford (2) || 31,676 || 10–7 || Box 
|- style="text-align:center; background-color:#ffbbbb" 
| 18 || April 24 || Dodgers || 0–3 || Greinke (3–0) || Cashner (1–3) || García (1) || 43,055 || 10–8 || Box
|- style="text-align:center; background-color:#ffbbbb" 
| 19 || April 25 || Dodgers || 8–11 || McCarthy (3–0) || Kennedy (0–1) ||  || 44,454 || 10–9 || Box
|- style="text-align:center; background-color:#bbffbb"
| 20 || April 26 || Dodgers || 3–1 || Morrow (1–0) || Baker (0–1) || Kimbrel (6) || 43,256 || 11–9 || Box
|- style="text-align:center; background-color:#ffbbbb"
| 21 || April 27 || Astros || 4–9 || Neshek (1–0) || Benoit (3–1) ||  || 19,532 || 11–10 || Box
|- style="text-align:center; background-color:#ffbbbb"
| 22 || April 28 || Astros || 3–14 || Hernández (1–2) || Ross (1–2) ||  || 22,796 || 11–11 || Box
|- style="text-align:center; background-color:#ffbbbb"
| 23 || April 29 || Astros || 2–7 || Keuchel (3–0) || Cashner (1–4) ||  || 21,824 || 11–12 || Box
|-

|- style="text-align:center; background-color:#bbffbb" 
| 24 || May 1 || Rockies || 14–3 || Kennedy (1–1) || Butler (2–2) ||  || 30,186 || 12–12 || Box
|- style="text-align:center; background-color:#bbffbb"
| 25 || May 2 || Rockies || 4–2 || Morrow (2–0) || de la Rosa (0–2) || Kimbrel (7) || 28,058 || 13–12 || Box
|- style="text-align:center; background-color:#bbffbb" 
| 26 || May 3 || Rockies || 8–6 || Shields (3–0) || Kendrick (1–4) || Kimbrel (8) || 34,197 || 14–12 || Box
|- style="text-align:center; background-color:#ffbbbb"
| 27 || May 4 || @ Giants || 0–2 || Bumgarner (3–1) || Ross (1–3) || Casilla (8) || 41,278 || 14–13 || Box
|- style="text-align:center; background-color:#ffbbbb" 
| 28 || May 5 || @ Giants || 0–6 || Vogelsong (1–2) || Cashner (1–5) ||  || 41,358 || 14–14 || Box
|- style="text-align:center; background-color:#bbffbb"
| 29 || May 6 || @ Giants || 9–1 || Kennedy (2–1) || Heston (2–3) ||  || 41,060 || 15–14 || Box
|- style="text-align:center; background-color:#ffbbbb" 
| 30 || May 7 || @ Diamondbacks || 0–11 || De La Rosa (3–2) || Despaigne (2–1) ||  || 16,929 || 15–15 || Box
|- style="text-align:center; background-color:#bbffbb"
| 31 || May 8 || @ Diamondbacks || 6–5 || Shields (4–0) || Burgos (0–1) || Kimbrel (9) || 28,677 || 16–15 || Box
|- style="text-align:center; background-color:#bbffbb"
| 32 || May 9 || @ Diamondbacks || 6–4 || Quackenbush (1–0) || Delgado (1–2) ||   || 27,340 || 17–15 || Box
|- style="text-align:center; background-color:#ffbbbb"
| 33 || May 10 || @ Diamondbacks || 1–2 || Ramirez (1–0) || Cashner (1–6) || Reed (2) || 24,881 || 17–16 || Box
|- style="text-align:center; background-color:#ffbbbb"
| 34 || May 12 || @ Mariners || 4–11 || Paxton (1–2) || Kennedy (2–2) ||  || 16,148 || 17–17 || Box
|- style="text-align:center; background-color:#bbffbb"
| 35 || May 13 || @ Mariners || 4–2 || Shields (5–0) || Walker (1–4) || Kimbrel (10) || 14,547 || 18–17 || Box
|- style="text-align:center; background-color:#bbffbb" 
| 36 || May 14 || Nationals || 8–3 || Ross (2–3) || Fister (2–2) ||  || 22,710 || 19–17 || Box
|- style="text-align:center; background-color:#ffbbbb"
| 37 || May 15 || Nationals || 0–10 || Zimmermann (3–2) || Despaigne (2–2) || Cole (1)  || 26,186 || 19–18 || Box
|- style="text-align:center; background-color:#ffbbbb" 
| 38 || May 16 || Nationals || 1–4 || Scherzer (4–3) || Cashner (1–7) || Storen (11) || 45,282 || 19–19 || Box
|- style="text-align:center; background-color:#ffbbbb" 
| 39 || May 17 || Nationals || 5–10  || Strasburg (3–4) || Kennedy (2–3) ||  || 37,032 || 19–20 || Box
|- style="text-align:center; background-color:#bbffbb" 
| 40 || May 19 || Cubs || 4–3 || Benoit (4–3) || Russell (0–1) || Kimbrel (11) || 25,917 || 20–20 || Box
|- style="text-align:center; background-color:#ffbbbb"
| 41 || May 20 || Cubs || 2–3 || Grimm (1–0) || Ross (2–4) || Rondón (9) || 25,028 || 20–21 || Box
|- style="text-align:center; background-color:#ffbbbb"
| 42 || May 21 || Cubs || 0–3 || Hendricks (1–1) || Despaigne (2–3) ||  || 30,021 || 20–22 || Box
|- style="text-align:center; background-color:#ffbbbb"
| 43 || May 22 || @ Dodgers || 1–2 || Hatcher (1–3) || Benoit (4–2) || Jansen (2) || 48,514 || 20–23 || Box
|- style="text-align:center; background-color:#ffbbbb" 
| 44 || May 23 || @ Dodgers || 2–0 || Bolsinger (3–0) || Kennedy (2–4) || Jansen (3) || 53,479 || 20–24 || Box
|- style="text-align:center; background-color:#bbffbb" 
| 45 || May 24 || @ Dodgers || 11–3 || Shields (6–0) || Frías (3–2) ||  || 50,182 || 21–24 || Box
|- style="text-align:center; background-color:#ffbbbb" 
| 46 || May 25 || @ Angels || 3–4 || Smith (1–1)  || Quackenbush (1–1) ||  || 38,055 || 21–25 || Box
|- style="text-align:center; background-color:#bbffbb" 
| 47 || May 26 || @ Angels || 4–0 || Thayer (1–0) || Smith (1–2) ||  || 32,334 || 22–25 || Box
|- style="text-align:center; background-color:#bbffbb" 
| 48 || May 27 || @ Angels || 5–4 || Cashner (2–7) || Richards (4–3) || Kimbrel (12) || 36,180 || 23–25 || Box
|- style="text-align:center; background-color:#ffbbbb" 
| 49 || May 28 || Pirates || 11–5 || Burnett (5–1) || Kennedy (2–5) ||  || 23,104 || 23–26 || Box
|- style="text-align:center; background-color:#bbffbb" 
| 50 || May 29 || Pirates || 6–2 || Kimbrel (1–1) || Scahill (1–3) ||  || 28,317 || 24–26 || Box
|- style="text-align:center; background-color:#ffbbbb" 
| 51 || May 30 || Pirates || 2–5 || Morton (2–0) || Ross (2–5) || Melancon (13) || 43,207 || 24–27 || Box
|- style="text-align:center; background-color:#bbffbb" 
| 52 || May 31 || Pirates || 7–1 || Despaigne (3–3) || Locke (3–3) ||  || 20,556 || 25–27 || Box
|-

|-
|- style="text-align:center; background-color:#ffbbbb" 
| 53 || June 1 || Mets || 0–7 || deGrom (6–4) || Cashner (2–8) ||  || 21,893 || 25–28 || Box
|- style="text-align:center; background-color:#bbffbb"
| 54 || June 2 || Mets || 7–2 || Kennedy (3–5) || Syndergaard (2–3) ||  || 22,264 || 26–28 || Box
|- style="text-align:center; background-color:#bbffbb"
| 55 || June 3 || Mets || 7–3 || Shields (7–0) || Gee (0–3) ||  || 24,398 || 27–28 || Box
|- style="text-align:center; background-color:#bbffbb" 
| 56 || June 5 || @ Reds || 6–2 || Ross (3–5) || Moscot (0–1) ||  || 33,381 || 28–28 || Box
|- style="text-align:center; background-color:#bbffbb"
| 57 || June 6 || @ Reds || 9–7 || Maurer (1–0) || Díaz (2–1) || Kimbrel (13) || 40,946 || 29–28 || Box
|- style="text-align:center; background-color:#ffbbbb"
| 58 || June 7 || @ Reds || 0–4 || Cueto (4–4) || Despaigne (3–4) ||  || 27,501 || 29–29 || Box
|- style="text-align:center; background-color:#bbffbb"
| 59 || June 8 || @ Braves || 5–3 (11) || Maurer (3–0) || Martin (2–3) || Kimbrel (14) || 21,458 || 30–29 || Box
|- style="text-align:center; background-color:#ffbbbb"
| 60 || June 9 || @ Braves || 5–6 || Johnson (2–3) || Benoit (4–3) || Grilli (16) || 24,049 || 30–30 || Box
|- style="text-align:center; background-color:#ffbbbb"
| 61 || June 10 || @ Braves || 1–4 || Perez (2–0) || Ross (3–6) || Johnson (3) || 21,465 || 30–31 || Box
|- style="text-align:center; background-color:#bbffbb"
| 62 || June 11 || @ Braves || 6–4 || Thayer (2–0) || Cunniff (2–2) || Kimbrel (15) || 25,759 || 31–31 || Box
|- style="text-align:center; background-color:#ffbbbb" 
| 63 || June 12 || Dodgers || 3–4 || Garcia (3–2) || Thayer (2–1) || Jansen (8) || 39,037 || 31–32 || Box
|- style="text-align:center; background-color:#bbffbb"
| 64 || June 13 || Dodgers || 2–1 || Maurer (4–0) || Greinke (5–2) || Kimbrel (16) || 43,525 || 32–32 || Box
|- style="text-align:center; background-color:#ffbbbb" 
| 65 || June 14 || Dodgers || 2–4 (12) || Ravin (2–0) || Thayer (2–2) || Jansen (9) || 40,056 || 32–33 || Box
|- style="text-align:center; background-color:#ffbbbb" 
| 66 || June 15 || Athletics || 1–9 || Hahn (4–5) || Ross (3–7) ||  || 30,018 || 32–34 || Box
|- style="text-align:center; background-color:#ffbbbb"
| 67 || June 16 || Athletics || 6–5 || Scribner (2–1) || Kimbrel (1–2) || Clippard (10) || 28,482 || 32–35 || Box
|- style="text-align:center; background-color:#ffbbbb" 
| 68 || June 17 || @ Athletics || 2–16 || Chavez (3–6) || Despaigne (3–5) ||  || 20,625 || 32–36 || Box
|- style="text-align:center; background-color:#bbffbb"
| 69 || June 18 || @ Athletics || 3–1 || Kennedy (4–5) || Graveman (3–4) || Kimbrel (17) || 16,643 || 33–36 || Box
|- style="text-align:center; background-color:#ffbbbb"
| 70 || June 19 || @ Diamondbacks || 2–4 || De La Rosa (6–3) || Shields (7–1) || Ziegler (10) || 27,394 || 33–37 || Box
|- style="text-align:center; background-color:#bbffbb"
| 71 || June 20 || @ Diamondbacks || 2–1 || Ross (4–7) || Ray (2–2) ||  || 33,649 || 34–37 || Box
|- style="text-align:center; background-color:#ffbbbb"
| 72 || June 21 || @ Diamondbacks || 7–2 || Hellickson (5–4) || Cashner (2–9) ||  || 35,590 || 34–38 || Box
|- style="text-align:center; background-color:#bbffbb"
| 73 || June 23 || @ Giants || 3–2 || Maurer (5–0) || Strickland (0–1) || Kimbrel (18) || 42,067 || 35–38 || Box
|- style="text-align:center; background-color:#ffbbbb"
| 74 || June 24 || @ Giants || 0–6 || Vogelsong (6–5) || Kennedy (4–6) ||  || 41,744 || 35–39 || Box
|- style="text-align:center; background-color:#ffbbbb"
| 75 || June 25 || @ Giants || 8–13 || Heston (8–5) || Shields (7–2) ||  || 41,533 || 35–40 || Box
|- style="text-align:center; background-color:#bbffbb"
| 76 || June 26 ||  Diamondbacks || 4–2 || Ross (5–7) || Ray (2–3) || Kimbrel (19) || 30,317 || 36–40 || Box
|- style="text-align:center; background-color:#bbffbb"
| 77 || June 27 ||  Diamondbacks || 7–2 || Cashner (3–9) || Hellickson (5–5) ||  || 40,717 || 37–40 || Box
|- style="text-align:center; background-color:#ffbbbb"
| 78 || June 28 ||  Diamondbacks || 6–4 || Anderson (4–2) || Despaigne (3–6) || Ziegler (12) || 32,223 || 37–41 || Box
|- style="text-align:center; background-color:#ffbbbb"
| 79 || June 30 ||  Mariners || 0–5 || Montgomery (3–2) || Kennedy (4–7) ||  || 30,368 || 37–42 || Box 
|-

|-
|- style="text-align:center; background-color:#ffbbbb"
| 80 || July 1 || Mariners || 0–7 || Walker (7–6) || Shields (7–3) ||  || 30,251 || 37–43 || Box
|- style="text-align:center; background-color:#bbffbb"
| 81 || July 2 || @ Cardinals || 5–3 || Kelley (1–2) || Villanueva (3–3) || Kimbrel (20) || 42,926 || 38–43 || Box
|- style="text-align:center; background-color:#bbffbb"
| 82 || July 3 || @ Cardinals || 1–2 || Benoit (5–3) || Rosenthal (1–1) || Kimbrel (21) || 47,330 || 39–43 || Box
|- style="text-align:center; background-color:#ffbbbb"
| 83 || July 4 || @ Cardinals || 1–2 || Maness (3–0) || Maurer (5–1) || Rosenthal (24) || 44,690 || 39–44 || Box
|- style="text-align:center; background-color:#ffbbbb"
| 84 || July 5 || @ Cardinals || 1–3 || Lynn (6–4) || Kennedy (4–8) || Siegrist (4) || 42,764 || 39–45 || Box
|- style="text-align:center; background-color:#ffbbbb"
| 85 || July 6 || @ Pirates || 1–2 || Hughes (2–1) || Maurer (5–2) ||  || 23,182 || 39–46 || Box
|- style="text-align:center; background-color:#ffbbbb"  
| 86 || July 7 || @ Pirates || 2–3 || Watson (2–1) || Benoit (5–4) || Melancon (38) || 21,887 || 39–47 || Box
|- style="text-align:center; background-color:#ffbbbb" 
| 87 || July 8 || @ Pirates || 2–5 || Guerra (2–0) || Cashner (3–10) || Bastardo (1) || 25,035 || 39–48 || Box
|- style="text-align:center; background-color:#ffbbbb"
| 88 || July 10 || @ Rangers || 3–4 || Rodríguez (3–4) || Kennedy (4–9) || Tolleson (13) || 33,033 || 39–49 || Box
|- style="text-align:center; background-color:#bbffbb"
| 89 || July 11 || @ Rangers || 6–5 || Benoit (6–4) || Tolleson (2–2) || Kimbrel (22) || 36,248 || 40–49 || Box
|- style="text-align:center; background-color:#bbffbb"
| 90 || July 12 || @ Rangers || 2–1 || Ross (6–7) || Gallardo (7–8) || Kimbrel (23) || 32,428 || 41–49 || Box
|- style="text-align:center; background-color:#bbcaff"
|colspan="10" | July 13–15: All-Star Break at Great American Ball Park in Cincinnati
|- style="text-align:center; background-color:#bbffbb" 
| 91 || July 17 || Rockies || 4–2 || Shields (8–3) || de la Rosa (6–4) || Kimbrel (24) || 31,025 || 42–49 || Box
|- style="text-align:center; background-color:#bbffbb"
| 92 || July 18 || Rockies || 5–4 || Maurer (6–2) || Friedrich (0–2) || Kimbrel (25) || 32,245 || 43–49 || Box
|- style="text-align:center; background-color:#bbbbbb"
| – || July 19 || Rockies || colspan="7" | Suspended in 4th inning (rain from Hurricane Dolores).  Makeup date: September 10.
|- style="text-align:center; background-color:#bbffbb"
| 93 || July 20 || Giants || 4–2 || Kennedy (5–9) || Hudson (5–8) || Kimbrel (26) || 35,033 || 44–49 || Box
|- style="text-align:center; background-color:#ffbbbb"
| 94 || July 21 || Giants || 3–9 || Heston (10–5) || Despaigne (3–7) ||  || 35,596 || 44–50 || Box
|- style="text-align:center; background-color:#ffbbbb"
| 95 || July 22 || Giants || 1–7 || Cain (2–1) || Maurer (6–3)  ||  || 38,435 || 44–51 || Box
|- style="text-align:center; background-color:#ffbbbb"
| 96 || July 23 || Marlins || 0–4 || Koehler (8–6) || Ross (6–8) || || 29,345 || 44–52 || Box
|- style="text-align:center; background-color:#bbffbb"
| 97 || July 24 || Marlins || 3–1 || Cashner (4–10) || Haren (7–6) || Kimbrel (27) || 25,897 || 45–52 || Box
|- style="text-align:center; background-color:#bbffbb"
| 98 || July 25 || Marlins || 3–1 || Kennedy (6–9) || Phelps (4–7) || Kimbrel (28) || 37,300 || 46–52 || Box
|- style="text-align:center; background-color:#bbffbb"
| 99 || July 26 || Marlins || 3–2 || Despaigne (4–7) || Latos (4–7) || Kimbrel (29) || 33,292 || 47–52 || Box
|- style="text-align:center; background-color:#ffbbbb"
| 100 || July 28 || @ Mets || 0–4 || Syndergaard (5–5) || Shields (8–4) ||  || 26,034 || 47–53 || Box
|- style="text-align:center; background-color:#bbffbb"
| 101 || July 29 || @ Mets || 7–3 || Ross (7–8) || Colón (9–10) ||  || 24,804 || 48–53 || Box 
|- style="text-align:center; background-color:#bbffbb"
| 102 || July 30 || @ Mets || 8–7 || Mateo (1–0) || Familia (2–1) || Kimbrel (30) || 35,604 || 49–53 || Box
|- style="text-align:center; background-color:#bbffbb"
| 103 || July 31 || @ Marlins || 8–3 || Maurer (7–3) || Ramos (0–3) ||  || 19,582 || 50–53 || Box
|-

|-
|- style="text-align:center; background-color:#bbffbb" 
| 104 || August 1 || @ Marlins || 5–3 || Despaigne (5–7) || Ureña (1–5) || Kimbrel (31) || 21,614 || 51–53 || Box
|- style="text-align:center; background-color:#ffbbbb"
| 105 || August 2 || @ Marlins || 5–2 || Ramos (1–3) || Maurer (7–4) ||  || 25,228 || 51–54 || Box
|- style="text-align:center; background-color:#bbffbb"
| 106 || August 3 || @ Brewers || 13–5 || Ross (8–8) || Peralta (2–6) ||  || 20,888 || 52–54 || Box
|- style="text-align:center; background-color:#ffbbbb" 
| 107 || August 4 || @ Brewers || 1–4 || Nelson (9–9) || Cashner (4–11) || Rodriguez (24) || 23,616 || 52–55 || Box
|- style="text-align:center; background-color:#ffbbbb" 
| 108 || August 5 || @ Brewers || 5–8 || Jungmann (6–3) || Kennedy (6–10) || Rodriguez (25) || 22,975 || 52–56 || Box
|- style="text-align:center; background-color:#ffbbbb" 
| 109 || August 6 || @ Brewers || 1–10 || Garza (6–12) || Despaigne (5–8) ||  || 28,789 || 52–57 || Box
|- style="text-align:center; background-color:#ffbbbb"
| 110 || August 7 || Phillies || 3–4 || Neris (2–0) || Quacken-bush (2–1) || Giles (4) || 31,334 || 52–58 || Box
|- style="text-align:center; background-color:#ffbbbb" 
| 111 || August 8 || Phillies || 2–4 || Morgan (3–3) || Ross (8–9) || Giles (5) || 44,567 || 52–59 || Box
|- style="text-align:center; background-color:#ffbbbb"
| 112 || August 9 || Phillies || 3–5 || Williams (4–8) || Cashner (4–12) || Giles (6) || 24,156 || 52–60 || Box
|- style="text-align:center; background-color:#bbffbb"
| 113 || August 10 || Reds || 2–1 || Kennedy (7–10) || Holmberg (1–1) || Kimbrel (32) || 23,223 || 53–60 || Box
|- style="text-align:center; background-color:#bbffbb"
| 114 || August 11 || Reds || 11–6  || Rea (1–0) || Lorenzen (3–8) ||  || 26,588 || 54–60 || Box
|- style="text-align:center; background-color:#ffbbbb"
| 115 || August 12 || Reds || 3–7 || Iglesias (3–4) || Shields (8–5) ||  || 21,397 || 54–61 || Box
|- style="text-align:center; background-color:#bbffbb"
| 116 || August 14 || @ Rockies || 9–5 || Norris (3–9) || Roberts (0–1) || || 33,697 || 55–61 || Box
|- style="text-align:center; background-color:#bbffbb"
| 117 || August 15 || @ Rockies || 9–7 || Quacken-bush (2–2) || Kahnle (0–1) || Kimbrel (33) || 37,554 || 56–61 || Box
|- style="text-align:center; background-color:#ffbbbb"
| 118 || August 16 || @ Rockies || 0–5 || Rusin (4–5) || Kennedy (7–11) ||  || 26,927 || 56–62 || Box
|- style="text-align:center; background-color:#bbffbb"
| 119 || August 17 || Braves || 5–3 || Rea (2–0) || Perez (4–4) || Kimbrel (34) || 23,716 || 57–62 || Box
|- style="text-align:center; background-color:#bbffbb"
| 120 || August 18 || Braves || 9–0 || Shields (9–5) || Wisler (5–3) ||  || 28,395 || 58–62 || Box
|- style="text-align:center; background-color:#bbffbb"
| 121 || August 19 || Braves || 3–2 || Kelley (2–2) || Marksberry (0–2) || Kimbrel (35) || 20,732 || 59–62  || Box
|- style="text-align:center; background-color:#bbffbb"
| 122 || August 21 || Cardinals || 9–3 || Cashner (5–12) || Lackey (10–8) ||  || 32,734 || 60–62 || Box
|- style="text-align:center; background-color:#bbffbb"
| 123 || August 22 || Cardinals || 8–0 || Kennedy (8–11) || Martínez (12–6) ||  || 44,816 || 61–62 || Box
|- style="text-align:center; background-color:#ffbbbb"
| 124 || August 23 || Cardinals || 3–10 || Wacha (15–4) || Rea (2–1) ||  || 33,756 || 61–63 || Box
|- style="text-align:center; background-color:#ffbbbb"
| 125 || August 25 || @ Nationals || 3–8 || Strasburg (8–6) || Shields (9–6) ||  || 34,199 || 61–64 || Box
|- style="text-align:center; background-color:#bbffbb"
| 126 || August 26 || @ Nationals || 6–5 || Ross (9–9) || Gonzalez (9–7) || Kimbrel (36) || 29,332 || 62-64 || Box
|- style="text-align:center; background-color:#ffbbbb"
| 127 || August 27 || @ Nationals || 2–4 || Ross (5–5) || Cashner (5–13) || Papelbon (21) || 28,908 || 62–65 || Box
|- style="text-align:center; background-color:#ffbbbb"
| 128 || August 28 || @ Phillies || 1–7 || Nola (5–1) || Kennedy (8–12) || Williams (1) || 25,145 || 62–66 || Box
|- style="text-align:center; background-color:#ffbbbb"
| 129 || August 29 || @ Phillies || 3–4 || Morgan (5–4) || Rea (2–2) || Giles (11) || 22,090 || 62–67 || Box
|- style="text-align:center; background-color:#bbffbb"
| 130 || August 30 || @ Phillies || 9–4 || Shields (10–6) || Asher (0–1) ||  || 22,624 || 63–67 || Box
|- style="text-align:center; background-color:#bbffbb" 
| 131 || August 31 || Rangers || 7–0 || Ross (10–9) || Lewis (14–7) ||  || 19,013 || 64–67 || Box
|-

|-
|- style="text-align:center; background-color:#ffbbbb"
| 132 || September 1 || Rangers || 6–8 || Ohlendorf (2–0) || Rzepczyn-ski (2–4) ||  || 21,215 || 64–68 || Box
|- style="text-align:center; background-color:#ffbbbb"
| 133 || September 2 || Rangers || 3–4 (10) || Dyson (5–4) || Norris (3–10) ||  || 18,730 || 64–69 || Box
|- style="text-align:center; background-color:#bbffbb"
| 134 || September 3 || Dodgers || 7–10 || Quacken-bush (3–2) || Johnson (2–6) || Benoit (2) || 33,505 || 65–69 || Box
|- style="text-align:center; background-color:#ffbbbb"
| 135 || September 4 || Dodgers || 4–8 ||  Bolsinger (6–3) || Mateo (1–1) ||  || 33,025  || 65–70 || Box
|- style="text-align:center; background-color:#ffbbbb" 
| 136 || September 5 || Dodgers || 0–2 || Wood (10–9) || Ross (10–10) || Jansen (29) || 43,536 || 65–71 || Box
|- style="text-align:center; background-color:#ffbbbb"
| 137 || September 6 || Dodgers || 1–5 || Anderson (9–8) || Cashner (5–14) ||  || 37,685 || 65–72 || Box
|- style="text-align:center; background-color:#ffbbbb"
| 138 || September 7 || Rockies || 4–6 || Kendrick (5–12) || Kennedy (8–13) || Axford (20) || 24,585 || 65–73 || Box
|- style="text-align:center; background-color:#bbffbb"
| 139 || September 8 || Rockies || 2–1 || Kimbrel (2–2) || Logan (0–3) ||  || 19,112 || 66–73 || Box
|- style="text-align:center; background-color:#bbffbb"
| 140 || September 9 || Rockies || 11–4 || Shields (11–6) || Rusin (5–8) ||  || 22,764 || 67–73 || Box
|- style="text-align:center; background-color:#ffbbbb"
| 141 || September 10 || Rockies || 3–4 || Miller (2–2) || Benoit (6–5) || Axford (21) || 21,922 || 67–74 || Box
|- style="text-align:center; background-color:#ffbbbb"
| 142 || September 11 || @ Giants || 1–9 || Peavy (6–6) || Cashner (6–15) ||  || 41,621 || 67–75 || Box
|- style="text-align:center; background-color:#ffbbbb" 
| 143 || September 12 || @ Giants || 0–8 || Bumgarner (18–7) || Kennedy (8–14) || || 41,564 || 67–76 || Box
|- style="text-align:center; background-color:#ffbbbb"
| 144 || September 13 || @ Giants || 3–10 || Leake (10–8) || Despaigne (5–9) ||  || 41,397 || 67–77 || Box
|- style="text-align:center; background-color:#bbffbb"
| 145 || September 14 || @ Diamondbacks || 10–3 || Shields (12–6) || Hellickson (9–9) ||  || 15,951 || 68–77 || Box
|- style="text-align:center; background-color:#ffbbbb"
| 146 || September 15 || @ Diamondbacks || 4–6 || Delgado (6–4) || Norris (3–11) || Ziegler (26) || 17,531 || 68–78 || Box
|- style="text-align:center; background-color:#bbffbb"
| 147 || September 16 || @ Diamondbacks || 4–3 || Cashner (6–15) || Ray (4–12) || Kimbrel (37) || 18,767 || 69–78 || Box
|- style="text-align:center; background-color:#ffbbbb"
| 148 || September 18 || @ Rockies || 4–7 || Bettis (8–5) || Kennedy (6–15) || Axford (24) || 27,303 || 69–79 || Box
|- style="text-align:center; background-color:#ffbbbb" 
| 149 || September 19 || @ Rockies || 2–10 || Bergman (3–0) || Erlin (0–1) ||  || 30,875 || 69–80 || Box
|- style="text-align:center; background-color:#bbffbb"
| 150 || September 20 || @ Rockies || 10–4 || Shields (13–6) || Kendrick (6–13) ||  || 26,927 || 70–80 || Box
|- style="text-align:center; background-color:#ffbbbb" 
| 151 || September 22 || Giants || 2–4 || Kontos (4–2) || Ross (10–11) || Casilla (35) || 25,043 || 70–81 || Box
|- style="text-align:center; background-color:#bbffbb"
| 152 || September 23 || Giants || 5–4 || Kimbrel (3–2) || Kontos (4–3) ||  || 23,556 || 71–81 || Box
|- style="text-align:center; background-color:#bbffbb"
| 153 || September 24 || Giants || 5–4 || Kimbrel (4–2) || Broadway (0–2) ||  || 31,137 || 72–81 || Box
|- style="text-align:center; background-color:#ffbbbb"
| 154 || September 25 || Diamondbacks || 3–6 || De La Rosa (14–8) || Kelly (0–1) || Ziegler (28) || 24,179 || 72–82 || Box
|- style="text-align:center; background-color:#bbffbb"
| 155 || September 26 || Diamondbacks || 3–0 || Erlin (1–1) || Hellickson (9–11) || Kimbrel (38) || 32,186 || 73–82 || Box
|- style="text-align:center; background-color:#ffbbbb" 
| 156 || September 27 || Diamondbacks || 2–4 || Chacín (2–1) || Shields (13–7) || Ziegler (29) || 24,179 || 73–83 || Box
|- style="text-align:center; background-color:#ffbbbb" 
| 157 || September 29 || Brewers || 3–4 || López (1–0) || Ross (10–12) || Rodriguez (38) || 36,047 || 73–84 || Box
|- style="text-align:center; background-color:#ffbbbb" 
| 158 || September 30 || Brewers || 0–5 || Davies (3–2) || Cashner (6–16) ||  || 30,514 || 73–85 || Box
|-

|-
|- style="text-align:center; background-color:#bbffbb" 
| 159 || October 1 || Brewers || 3–1 || Kennedy (9–15) || Jungmann (9–8) || Kimbrel (39) || 22,129 || 74–85 || Box
|- style="text-align:center; background-color:#ffbbbb"
| 160 || October 2 || @ Dodgers || 2–6 || Wood (12–12) || Kelly (0–2) ||  || 45,564 || 74–86 || Box
|- style="text-align:center; background-color:#ffbbbb"
| 161 || October 3 || @ Dodgers || 1–2 || Greinke (19–3) || Erlin (1–2) || Jansen (36) || 52,352 || 74–87 || Box
|- style="text-align:center; background-color:#ffbbbb"
| 162 || October 4 || @ Dodgers || 3–6 || Peralta' (3–1) || Garcés (0–1) || Hatcher (4) || 42,863 || 74–88 || Box
|-

Roster

Player statsBoth tables are sortable.BattingNote: G = Games played; AB = At bats; R = Runs scored; H = Hits; 2B = Doubles; 3B = Triples; HR = Home runs; RBI = Runs batted in; AVG = Batting average; SB = Stolen basesPitchingNote: W = Wins; L = Losses; ERA = Earned run average; G = Games pitched; GS = Games started; SV = Saves; IP = Innings pitched; H = Hits allowed; R = Runs allowed; ER = Earned runs allowed; BB = Walks allowed; K = Strikeouts  

Farm system

Farm system''

References

External links
San Diego Padres official site
2015 San Diego Padres at Baseball-Reference.com

San Diego Padres seasons
San Diego Padres
2015 in sports in California